The discography of Martha Wainwright, a Canadian-American singer-songwriter, consists of six studio albums, one live album, one soundtrack album, four extended plays (EPs), six singles (including one as a featured artist), and ten music videos. Wainwright's self-titled debut album was released through Zoë Records and Drowned in Sound in April 2005. Although its success was limited, Wainwright reached number 43 on Billboard's Top Heatseekers chart. Wainwright's second album, I Know You're Married But I've Got Feelings Too, was released through the same labels in June 2008, resulting in a No. 10 position on the Top Heatseekers chart and No. 6 in Canada, among other chart positions throughout Europe and Australia. Sans Fusils, Ni Souliers, à Paris: Martha Wainwright's Piaf Record, a tribute to legendary French singer Édith Piaf, was released in November 2009.

Wainwright's first release was an album-length independent cassette of ten tracks, Ground Floor, in 1997. This was followed in 1999 by her first EP, released under Querbes Service in 1999; two of its songs would later appear on her debut album (2005). Wainwright released two EPs in 2005—Bloody Mother Fucking Asshole and I Will Internalize—both of which contained some tracks that also appeared on her self-titled studio album. The EP iTunes Live from Montreal was released digitally in December 2008 in Canada, and contained six live tracks from her second album, I Know You're Married But I've Got Feelings Too.

Wainwright's singles include "Factory", "When the Day Is Short", "Far Away", "Set the Fire to the Third Bar" (Snow Patrol featuring Wainwright), and "Bleeding All Over You". She has contributed songs to various soundtracks and compilation albums, including Tommy Tricker and the Stamp Traveller (1988), The Aviator (2004), Leonard Cohen: I'm Your Man (2005), and Song of America (2007). Wainwright has contributed backing vocals to all of her brother's (Rufus Wainwright) albums, and was a featured performer on his 2007 tribute album, Rufus Does Judy at Carnegie Hall.

Albums

Studio albums

Live albums

Collaborative albums

Soundtrack albums

Extended plays

Singles

As lead artist

As featured artist

Other charted songs

Music videos

Other contributions

Soundtracks

Compilations

Other guest appearances

References

General
 
 

Specific

External links
Martha Wainwright's official site

Wainwright, Martha
Folk music discographies